The AWA 3B Wireless Set was a wireless radio transceiver used by the Australian Army and Coastwatchers during the Second World War. The unit was made by the Australian company Amalgamated Wireless.

External links
http://www.qsl.net/vk2dym/radio/3BZa.htm

World War II Australian electronics
Military equipment of the Australian Army
Military radio systems